O'Hare, located on the far north side of Chicago, is one of the city's 77 community areas. O'Hare International Airport is located within the boundaries of this community area. This community area is the only one that extends outside Cook County; the western edge (an area comprising the southwest part of the airport) is in DuPage County.

The area is a transportation hub containing O'Hare International Airport as well as major roads such as Interstate 90, its auxiliary Interstate 190, Interstate 294, Illinois Route 72, Illinois Route 171, U.S. Route 12 and U.S. Route 45. This allows the O'Hare neighborhood, combined with the nearby suburb of Rosemont, to work as an edge city.

History
In the Second Treaty of Prairie du Chien, Alexander Robinson was given two square miles of land in what is now the O'Hare community area as a reward for shielding white settlers during Battle of Fort Dearborn. The land was slowly settled over the remainder of the nineteenth century despite the opening of a railroad depot in 1887. During World War II, the Douglas Aircraft Company produced cargo planes in the area. After the war, the facility became a commercial airport that the City of Chicago eventually developed into O'Hare International Airport. In response to the annexation, the University of Chicago revised its map of official community areas to add O'Hare as the 76th area. It is one of only two revisions to occur since the late 1920s.

Demographics

According to an analysis by the Chicago Metropolitan Agency for Planning, the area had 12,377 residents comprising 6,125 households as of June 2018. The racial makeup of the area was 79.87% white, 1.22% African American, 7.93% Asian American and 4.52% were either American Indian, Alaska Native, Native Hawaiian-Pacific Islander or some other race. Hispanic or Latino residents of any race were 6.46% of the population.

16.8% were under the age of 19 years, 26.7% were age 20 years to age 34 years, 23.8% were age 35 years to age 49 years, 17.6% were age 50 years to age 64 years and 15.1% were 65 years or older.

The median household income was $49,295 compared to a median income of $52,497 for Chicago at-large. The area had an Income distribution in which 28.8% of households earned less than $25,000 annually; 21.6% of households earned between $25,000 and $49,999; 24.1% of households earned between $50,000 and $74,999; 12.9% of households earned between $75,000 and $99,999; 7.5% of households earned between $100,000 and $149,999 and 5% of households earned more than $150,000. This was a less equitable distribution than Chicago-at large which had a distribution of 26.7%, 21.1%, 15.8%, 10.9%, 12.7% and 12.9.

Economy
The corporate headquarters of Bally Total Fitness, Independent Grocers Alliance, Lafarge North America, True Value and U.S. Cellular are located in the O'Hare area. The Consulate-General of the Dominican Republic, which is responsible for facilitating trade between the Dominican Republic and the United States is located at 8700 West Bryn Mawr Avenue. Nippon Cargo Airlines and Suzlon Energy have their American headquarters in the O'Hare community area. O'Hare was home to the headquarters of Wilson Sporting Goods until 2016, when the company chose to move to One Prudential Plaza.

The top five employing industry sectors in O'Hare are transportation (59.2%), accommodation and food (7.6%), professional (6.3%), administration (4.7%), and information (4.6%). 68.5% of these workers come from outside of Chicago. The top five employing industry sectors of community residents are healthcare (11.5%), retail trade (9.9%), manufacturing (8.7%), transportation (8.4%), and administration (8.2%)

Notable people
 Joseph Grendys (born 1961), chairman, president, CEO, and owner of Koch Foods. He is a resident of the O'Hare area.
 Joseph Miedzianowski (born 1953), Chicago police officer convicted of using his position as a member of the gangs task force to run a narcotics trafficking ring. He resided on the 8500 block of West St. Joseph Avenue before his arrest.

Transportation
Transportation in the area is centered on access to the airport. The O'Hare Transfer station is on the Metra North Central Service. The Blue Line run through this area connecting the airport to downtown. Accessibility to people not going to or coming from the airport is at the neighborhood's Cumberland Avenue station or the nearby Rosemont-River Road station.

Education
The O'Hare area is part of City of Chicago School District #299 and City Colleges of Chicago District #508. For the residential areas, the zoned K-8 school is Everett McKinley Dirksen School, while William Howard Taft High School serves as the high school. The nearest City Colleges campus is Wilbur Wright College in neighboring Dunning. The O'Hare neighborhood is also home to a DePaul University satellite campus.

Politics
The O'Hare community area is located in two wards: The area north of Lawrence Avenue is in the 41st ward and the area to the south is in the 38th ward. They are represented on the Chicago City Council by Anthony Napolitano and Nicholas Sposato respectively.

In the United States House of Representatives, the O'Hare community area is divided between Illinois's 5th and Illinois's 9th congressional districts, represented by Democrats Mike Quigley and Jan Schakowsky respectively. The area is similarly divided in the state legislature. It is represented by Democrats Robert Martwick and Laura Murphy in the Illinois Senate and by Democrat Marty Moylan and Republican Bradley Stephens in the Illinois House of Representatives.

In the 2016 presidential election, the O'Hare area cast 2,300 votes for Hillary Clinton, 1,966 votes Donald Trump, 112 votes for Gary Johnson and 62 votes for Jill Stein. In the 2012 presidential election, the O'Hare area cast 2,241 votes for Barack Obama and 1,769 votes for Mitt Romney.

References

External links
 Official City of Chicago O'Hare Community Map
 The Northwest Chicago Historical Society's page on O'Hare
 Everett McKinley Dirksen School

Community areas of Chicago
O'Hare International Airport
North Side, Chicago